Axinoptera turgidata is a moth in the family Geometridae. It is found on Borneo and Peninsular Malaysia.

The wings are a uniform grey with a pale spot on the hindwing margin.

References

Moths described in 1866
Eupitheciini
Moths of Asia